Ernst Eikhof (6 May 1892 – 19 November 1978) was a German international footballer.

References

1892 births
1978 deaths
German footballers
Association football defenders
Germany international footballers
SC Victoria Hamburg players